Dahari is a surname. Notable people with the surname include:

 Mokhtar Dahari (1953–1991), Malaysian footballer
 Yosefa Dahari (born 1971), Israeli singer